Dare Me may refer to: 

 Dare Me (novel), by Megan Abbott, 2012
 Dare Me (TV series), an American drama series based on Abbott's novel
 "Dare Me" (song), by The Pointer Sisters, 1985